This is a list of countries and territories by number of scientific publications in English. Scientific citable documents counts are from journals classified by Scopus.

References 

Scientific and technical journal articles
Technical communication